The 2020–21 Central Michigan Chippewas men's basketball team represented Central Michigan University in the 2020–21 NCAA Division I men's basketball season. The Chippewas, led by ninth-year head coach Keno Davis, played their home games at McGuirk Arena in Mount Pleasant, Michigan as members of the Mid-American Conference. Starting this season, the MAC announced the removal of divisions. The Chippewas finished the season 7–16, 3–13 in MAC play to finish in 11th place. They failed to qualify for the MAC tournament.

Following the season, the school fired Davis after nine years.

Previous season
The Chippewas finished the 2019–20 season 14–18, 7–11 in MAC play to finish in fourth place in the West Division. They lost in the first round of the MAC tournament to Ohio.

Offseason

Departures

Incoming transfers

2020 recruiting class

Roster

Schedule and results 

|-
!colspan=12 style=| Regular season

|-

Sources

References

Central Michigan Chippewas men's basketball seasons
Central Michigan Chippewas
Central Michigan Chippewas men's basketball
Central Michigan Chippewas men's basketball